Karur is a Lok Sabha (Parliament of India) constituency in Tamil Nadu. Its Tamil Nadu Parliamentary Constituency number is 23 of 39.

Assembly segments
Karur Lok Sabha constituency is composed of the following assembly segments:

Before 2009:

1.Aravakurichi

2.Karur

3.Krishnarayapuram (SC)

4.Marungapuri (defunct)

5.kuliththalai (Move to Perambalur)

6.Thottiyam (defunct)

Members of the Parliament

Election results

General Election 2019

General Election 2014

General Election 2009

General Election 2004

See also
 Karur
 List of Constituencies of the Lok Sabha

References

External links
Karur lok sabha  constituency election 2019 date and schedule

Lok Sabha constituencies in Tamil Nadu
Karur